In the Chicago mayoral election of 1923, Democrat William E. Dever defeated Republican Arthur C. Lueder and Socialist William A. Cunnea. Elections were held on April 3, the same day as aldermanic runoffs.

To win their party's nominations, Dever won an unopposed Democratic primary election, while Lueder handily defeated three opponents in the Republican Party's primary.

Nominations

Democratic primary 
Ahead of 1923, the Democratic Party had long been divided. Carter Harrison Jr. and Edward Fitzsimmons Dunne had once each led factions which held equal prominence to a faction led by Roger Charles Sullivan. However, by the end of the 1910s, Sullivan's wing of the Chicago Democratic Party had dwarfed theirs. By then, the blocs of Harrison and Dunne had effectively united as well. When Sullivan died in 1920, George Brennan became the party leader. He sought to unify the Democratic Party factions.

While he had been long discussed as a potential mayoral candidate for almost two decades, in 1923, a combination of conditions and events catapulted William E. Dever to the nomination. In December 1922, a number of influential Chicago advocates for clean government had held a forum led by Mrs. Kellog Fairbank and Reverend Graham Taylor at the City Club of Chicago about the pending mayoral election which Clarence Darrow attended. This led to the establishment of the Non-Partisan Citizens Mayoral Committee led by Mrs. Kellog Fairbank, which sought to lobby both parties to put forth truthful alternatives to the corrupt and demagogic mayor Thompson. They decided that they would analyze prospective candidates and compile  a shortlist of candidates they would be willing to back. Brennan, who was unable to narrow out the field of prospective candidates to personally back, took an interest in these efforts, seeing them as an opportunity to help inform him in narrowing out the field. The committee ultimately put forth a shortlist of seven prospective candidates they backed, including Judge William E. Dever. Dever had also been championed as a potential candidate by a broad array of individuals, including the Municipal Voters' League's George Sikes, William L. O'Connell (a leader in the party's Harrison-Dunne bloc), and Progressive Republican Harold Ickes. It was believed that Dever could unite the Democratic Party and serve as a clean and honest leader of the city's government. Brennan, particularly impressed that Dever had backing from both
members of the Harrison-Dunne faction and from reformers outside of the party, decided to take a closer look at him as a candidate. Upon meeting with him, he found comradery and a positive working dynamic with Dever. He struck an arrangement under which, if elected mayor,
he would allow Dever independence, but expected that Dever would, in turn, agree not utilize his patronage powers to build a political machine usurping Brennan's leadership of the party. After finding no opposition to Dever as a candidate from within the party leadership, he announced the next day that Dever was the party-backed candidate for mayor.

Before Dever had become the consensus candidate, among the individuals speculated as prospective candidates by the press was Anton Cermak.

Brennan worked to ensure that Dever was unopposed in the Democratic primary.

Despite Brennan pushing forth Dever's candidacy, the public generally did not view Dever to be a "machine" candidate. The public generally perceived that reformist citizens organizations had advocated Dever to the Democratic party leaders.

The Democratic primary was regarded as having had a large turnout, considering that there were uncontested races for mayor, City Treasurer and City Clerk.

Republican primary 
Due to his poor health, there had been uncertainty as to whether two-term incumbent Republican William H. Thompson would run for reelection. He was also seen as more vulnerable to being unseated by a strong Democratic opponent, as Thompson had severed ties with a number of key political allies, including Robert E. Crowe and Frederick Lundin. One of the final factors in Thompson's decision not to seek reelection was a scandal involving campaign manager being implicated in shaking down vendors of school supplies for bribes and political contributions. Thompson had bled middle class support over rumors of corruption in his administration, and had bled support from working class votes over his backing at the time of Prohibition, which Chicago voters had made their opposition known by a margin in excess of eighty-points in a 1919 referendum on the matter. Uneager  to joust with Dever, nearly a week after Dever became the presumptive Democratic candidate, Thompson announced his decision not to run with only a month before the Republican primary. This created an open race for the nomination.

Candidates 

 Bernard P. Barasa, judge of the Municipal Court of Chicago
Edward R. Listinger, member of the Cook County Board of Review,
Arthur C. Lueder, Chicago postmaster and businessman
Arthur M. Millard, president of the Masonic Bureau of Service and Employment

Campaign 
Arthur C. Lueder was backed by the Brundage-McCormick/Tribune and Deneen blocs of the party. He was also backed by Robert E. Crowe. Lueder ran on a "ticket", mutually being endorsed by and endorsing city treasurer candidate John V. Healy and city clerk candidate William H. Cruden, neither of whom were opposed in their primaries.

Edward R. Litsinger was backed by the William Randolph Hearst and Frederick Lundin blocs of the party, and was also the candidate supported by the remaining members of Thompson's dwindling faction of the party.

Bernard P. Barasa ran on a pro-liquor platform amid prohibition.

Results 
Lueder won a greater margin of victory than even his own campaign had expected.

Socialist nomination 
William A. Cunnea was nominated by the Socialist Party. Cunnea had been a Democratic nominee for alderman in 1899, and had been the Socialist nominee for Cook County State's Attorney in 1912 and 1916. By profession, Cunnea was a labor lawyer.

General election

Campaigning 

Both major party candidates campaigned as reformers. On March 18, 1923, Oscar Hewitt of the "Chicago Tribune" characterized the campaign one of the “mildest” 

At the time of the election, Chicago was seen as a Republican-leaning city, especially due to the influx of black voters to the city as part of the Great Migration, a demographic largely voted for the Republican Party at the time. Furthermore, the city had not voted Democratic in a presidential election over the previous three decades, with the Republican nominees carrying the city's vote in all but the 1912 presidential election when former Republican president Theodore Roosevelt carried the city on the third party Progressive Party ticket. However, factors harming the Republican Party's prospects included a divide among the party's ranks, the scandals that had tarnished Thompson's administration, and tax increases made during Thompson's mayoralty.

Dever was only the second resident of Edgewater to run for mayor, after only Nathaniel Sears, and consequentially would be the first Edgewater resident to serve as mayor. Dever had a strong reputation for honesty, and was seen to be smart and well-spoken. He was supported by many reformers and independents. Many went so far as to organize the Independent Dever League, a group created to act in support of Dever's campaign. Dever won strong backing from progressive independents.

The traction issue reemerged in this election. Lueder promised to "study" the possibility of municipal purchase of street railways. Dever, on the other hand, was far more enthusiastic on the issue, proclaiming that the most critical task for the victor of the election would be to resolve problems with the city's public transit. These problems included price increases and declining quality of service provided by the Chicago Surface Lines. A long time advocate for municipal ownership, Dever believed that it would be ideal for the city to buy-out the Chicago Surface Lines once their franchise expired in 1927. He also had hopes of possibly acquiring the Chicago Rapid Transit Company. Socialist Cunnea campaigned for a 5-cent fare.

Lueder offered a strong contrast to the incumbent Republican mayor, being dignified and soft-spoken, with a strong reputation of personal integrity. Thompson did not campaign at all on behalf of Republican candidate Lueder. Lueder had strong support from the business community. Running a tidy campaign, positioning himself as a nonpolitical businessman, Lueder focused on securing the support of the Republican Party's factions. He maintained his support from the Brundage-McCormick and Deneen factions and picked up the backing of key figures from the Thompson faction of the party despite Thompson's own refusal to back him.

Lueder attempted to portray himself as an expert administrator. Lueder argued that his experience in real estate and as postmaster had sufficiently prepared him for the administrative role of the mayoralty, asserting that it provided a more valuable experience than holding various minor elected posts. He stated, "I believe what the people want is a businessman for mayor. I believe that want a man who will devote his time to his duties as mayor of Chicago, and not building up a political machine.

Lueder refused to formally debate Dever, despite Dever's request for debates. However, on numerous occasions they spoke at the same events.

Eugene V. Debs actively campaigned for Socialist nominee William A. Cunnea.

The campaign was largely uneventful, with little tenuous debate or controversy arising. However, in the final stretch of the campaign, a level of anti-Catholic sentiment was vocalized by select segments of Chicago's population that were unhappy at the prospect of Dever, as a Catholic, being mayor. At the same time, some made an effort at the close of the election to draw a link between the Ku Klux Klan and the Republican campaign. Outside of this last minute heightening of discourse in select corners, the campaign proved to be relatively tame.

Endorsements

Polling 
Early into the race the candidates ran close in the polls. However, Dever took a strong lead in the race. By the end of the race, gambling boss James Patrick O'Leary had assigned 1-7 betting odds in favor of a Dever victory.

Chicago Tribune straw polls 
The Chicago Tribune conducted straw polls during a portion of the campaign. These were not modern scientific polls, and many focused on specific sub-portions of the city's populace, rather than true representative samples.

Tribune began conducting these polls on March 7, 1923, with the first being published the next day. By March 18, the Tribune's analysis of its polling was that Dever began the general election campaign with an advantage over Lueder.

The final amalgamation of the polls predicted Dever receiving 52.21%, Leuder receiving 39.37, and Cunnea receiving 8.42%. It had predicted 378,000 votes for Dever, 285,000 votes for Lueder, and 61,000 votes for Cunnea. The prediction of total votes for Lueder proved to be extremely accurate. After the election, the newspaper argued that the reason its polls predicted a larger socialist vote was because industrial workers were proportionally a greater share of those questioned in the straw polls than a share of the election vote. They also found that they had underestimated the share that Dever would receive of the black vote.

Results 

The voter turnout in the election (78%) was the second-lowest in at least 24 years, behind only the 74% that participated in the 1901 election.

Dever's performance was strong. With the exception of William Hale Thompson's 147,477 margin of victory in 1915, no mayor had carried a mayoral election in Chicago with a margin of victory exceeding 25,000 in the previous two decades. Dever had a 132,319 vote margin of victory.

Dever won thirty-two of the city's fifty wards (the 1923 election was the first after the city had redistricted itself from 35 to 50 wards). His greatest share of votes was in the city's ten inner-city ethnic wards, located in traditional Democratic strongholds. Lueder won the wards in traditionally-Republican areas on the edge of the city. However, Dever made inroads with voters in these edge wards. Dever also had made inroads among Black and Jewish voters.

Dever received 83.47% of the Polish-American vote, while Lueder received 12.43% and Cunnea received 4.04%.

Dever received more than 80% of the Italian American vote.

Dever received 53% of the African American vote by some accounts. This was a change from the typical voting pattern of Chicago African American voters, who regularly voted for the Republican Party.

Dever received slightly less than half of the Swedish American and German American votes.

References 

Mayoral elections in Chicago
Chicago
Chicago
20th century in Chicago
1920s in Chicago